Biren Sing Engti (born 2 March 1945) is an Indian politician from Karbi Anglong, Assam. He is a member of Indian National Congress (INC) political party. He  was a member of the 14th Lok Sabha of India. He represented the Autonomous District constituency of Assam.

External links
 Home Page on the Parliament of India's Website

1945 births
Indian National Congress politicians from Assam
Living people
India MPs 2004–2009
People from Karbi Anglong district
India MPs 2009–2014
India MPs 1971–1977
India MPs 1977–1979
India MPs 1980–1984
India MPs 1984–1989
Lok Sabha members from Assam
India MPs 2014–2019